The Nashville Junior Predators were a USA Hockey-sanctioned Tier III ice hockey team in the North American 3 Hockey League (NA3HL). The team played their home games at Ford Ice Center in Antioch, Tennessee, after spending their first two seasons at A-Game SportsPlex in Franklin, Tennessee. At the end of October 2017, Jr. Predators games were cancelled by the league before the team was eventually removed from the NA3HL at the end of November.

The players, ages 16–20, carried amateur status under Junior A guidelines and hoped to earn a spot on higher levels of junior ice hockey in the United States and Canada, Canadian major junior, collegiate, and eventually professional teams. The organization also fields teams at the pee wee, squirt, and midget levels of youth hockey.

Season-by-season records

References

External links
 Tier III Jr. Predators website
 Youth Jr. Predators website

Ice hockey teams in Tennessee
Sports in Nashville, Tennessee
Ice hockey clubs established in 2014
Ice hockey clubs disestablished in 2017
2014 establishments in Tennessee
2017 disestablishments in Tennessee